Everybody Dance the Honky Tonk is an album by American organist Bill Doggett released by the King label in 1956.

Reception

AllMusic reviewer Bill Dahl stated "This hugely influential jazz-laced R&B quartet plays their classic two-part instrumentals and several more groovers".

Track listing
 "Honky Tonk (Part 1)" (Bill Doggett, Billy Butler, Clifford Scott, Shep Shepherd) – 3:04
 "Honky Tonk (Part 2)" (Doggett, Butler, Scott, Shepherd) – 2:36
 "On the Sunny Side of the Street" (Jimmy McHugh, Dorothy Fields) – 2:54
 "Afternoon Jump" (B. Red Ellis) – 2:51
 "Peacock Alley" (Butler) – 2:36
 "Big Boy" (Bill Jennings) – 3:08
 "Slow Walk" (Sil Austin) – 2:34
 "Nothin' Yet" (Ellis) – 3:41
 "When Your Lover Has Gone" (Einar Aaron Swan) – 2:44
 "Honky Tonk Number Three" (Doggett, Butler, Scott, Shepherd) – 2:44
 "Leaps and Bounds" (Scott, Ellis, Butler, Shepherd) – 5:30
Recorded in Cincinnati, OH on May 19, 1954 (track 4), September 18, 1956 (track 11), October 12, 1956 (tracks 5 & 10) and October 29, 1956 (tracks 6-8), and New York City, NY on January 12, 1956 (track 9), June 16, 1956 (tracks 1-3)

Personnel
Bill Doggett – organ
Clifford Scott – tenor saxophone, alto saxophone (tracks 1-3 & 5-11)
Irving "Skinny" Brown – tenor saxophone (track 4)
Clifford Bush (track 4), Billy Butler (tracks 1-3 & 5-11), John Faire (tracks 5-8, 10 & 11) – guitar
Edwyn Conley (tracks 5-8 & 10), Al Lucas (track 9), Carl Pruitt (tracks 1-3), Clarence Mack (track 4) - bass
Shep Shepherd – drums
Tommy Brown – vocals, maracas, claves (tracks 6-8)

References 

King Records (United States) albums
Bill Doggett albums
1956 albums